Seth Schwartz is an American historian and is the Lucius N. Littauer Professor of Classical Jewish Civilization at Columbia University. Schwartz earned the B.A. from Yeshiva University in 1979, and the Ph.D. from Columbia University in 1985.

Books
The Ancient Jews from Alexander to Muhammad, Cambridge: Cambridge University Press, 2014
Were the Jews A Mediterranean Society: Reciprocity and Solidarity in Ancient Judaism, Princeton: Princeton University Press, 2010.
Imperialism and Jewish Society, 200 BCE to 640 CE, Princeton: Princeton University Press, 2001.
Josephus and Judaean Politics, Leiden: Brill, 1990.
With R. Bagnall, A. Cameron and K. Worp, Consuls of the Later Roman Empire, Atlanta: Scholars Press, 1987.

Awards 
2001: National Jewish Book Award in Scholarship for Imperialism and Jewish Society: 200 B.C.E. to 640 C.E.

References 

Historians of antiquity
American historians
Historians of Jews and Judaism